The 2010–11 Pittsburgh Panthers women's basketball team represented the University of Pittsburgh in the 2010–11 NCAA Division I women's basketball season. The Panthers, coached by Agnus Berenato, suffered their first losing season since 2004-05.  The Panthers are a member of the Big East Conference and play their home games at the Petersen Events Center in Pittsburgh, Pennsylvania.

Previous season
The 2010-11 Pitt women's basketball went 16-15, a disappointing finish considering that in December, the team had climbed as high as 15th in the nation in both the AP and Coaches' national polls. Finishing with the 12th seed in the Big East tournament, the Panthers lost in the first round of the tournament to Louisville, but still earned its fifth straight post-season national tournament appearance in the 2010 Women's National Invitation Tournament. However, Pitt lost its opening game in the WNIT at Toledo.

Offseason
The Panthers return four starters, losing only starting forward sophomore Pepper Wilson. The offseason was characterized with an unusual turnover in both players and coaching staff. Center/forward Pepper Wilson, sophomore forward Kate Popovec, and sophomore guard Sarah Ogoke transferred, while assistant coaches Jeff Williams, Caroline McCombs, and Yolette McPhee-McCuin all left to pursue additional opportunities. Incoming players include forward Kyra Dunn as well as guards Marquel Davis, Yasmin Fuller, and Asia Logan.  This leaves the Panthers with an unusual distribution of players by academic class, with five seniors and six freshman, but with no juniors or sophomores. New coaches include the former head coach of the WNBA's New York Liberty, Patty Coyle, along with Khadija Head, and former Pitt point guard Mallorie Winn.

The women's basketball team enters the season with modest external expectation having been picked to finish 13th in the Big East Conference in a preseason poll of conference coaches. The Panthers started the season receiving two votes in the preseason national top 25 AP Poll.

Roster

*Dismissed from the team during the season following the St. Francis (PA) game on December 1, 2010 for a violation of team rules.

Schedule
Pitt's 2010-11 schedule.

|-
!colspan=9| Exhibition

|-
!colspan=9| Regular Season

|-
!colspan=9| Postseason†Big East Women's Basketball Championship

Rankings

Awards and honors

 Shayla Scott was selected as the College/University winner of the Pat Blayden Spirit of Sport Award.
 Taneisha Harrison was selected to the All-Big East Women’s Basketball Second Team
 Chelsea Cole was tabbed Honorable Mention All-Big East.
 Chelsea Cole became just the fourth player in Pitt women’s basketball history to record 1,000 rebounds over a career. She finished with 1,003 boards.

See also
Pittsburgh Panthers women's basketball
Pittsburgh Panthers men's basketball
2010–11 Pittsburgh Panthers men's basketball team
Pittsburgh Panthers
University of Pittsburgh
Big East Conference

References

External links
 Official Site

Pittsburgh Panthers women's basketball seasons
Pittsburgh